Rateb or Ratib may also refer to:

Religion
 Hizb Rateb is a collective recitation of Quran in Sufism
 Rifaʽi Ratib is an islamic ritual

Surname
Notable people with the surname include:
 Abu Bakr Ratib (born 1896), Egyptian fencer
 Abu Ratib (born 1962), Syrian singer
 Ahmed Rateb (1949–2016), Egyptian actor
 Aisha Rateb (1928–2013), Egyptian lawyer and politician
 Gamil Ratib (1926–2018), Egyptian actor 
 Hassan Rateb, Egyptian businessman
 James Ratib, Malaysian politician
 Saleh Rateb (born 1994), Jordanian footballer
 Mohamed Rateb (born 2005), Egyptian Genius